From the late 18th to the mid-19th century, various states of the United States of America allowed the enslavement of human beings, mostly of African Americans,  Africans who had been transported from Africa during the Atlantic slave trade. The institution of slavery was established in North America in the 16th century under Spanish colonization, British colonization, French colonization, and Dutch colonization.

After the United States was founded in 1776, abolition of slavery occurred in the Northern United States. The country was split into slave and free states. Still, slavery was not finally ended throughout the nation until near the end of the American Civil War and the passage of the Thirteenth Amendment in 1865.

Background 

On 22 August 1791, the Haitian Revolution began; it concluded in 1804 with the Independence of Haiti. Slavery in Haiti thus came to an end, and Haiti became the first country on the planet that abolished slavery.

In 1804, Alexander von Humboldt visited the United States and expressed the idea that slavery was not a good way to treat citizens; this was during Thomas Jefferson's presidency. Humboldt's ideas were expanded by the following generation of American politicians, writers, and clergy members, among them Ralph Waldo Emerson and Abraham Lincoln.

The growing U.S. abolitionism movement sought to gradually or immediately end slavery in the United States. It was active from the late colonial era until the American Civil War, which culminated in the abolition of American slavery through the Thirteenth Amendment to the United States Constitution.

Civil War 

The Civil War in the United States from 1861 until 1865 was between the United States of America ("the Union" or "the North") and the Confederate States of America (Southern states that voted to secede: "the Confederacy" or "the South"). The central cause of the war was the status of slavery, especially the expansion of slavery into newly acquired land after the Mexican–American War. On the eve of the Civil War in 1860, four million of the 32 million American population (nearly 13%) were black enslaved people, mainly in the southern United States.

The practice of slavery in the United States was one of the key political issues of the 19th century; decades of political unrest over slavery led up to the war.
At the start of the Civil War, there were 34 states in the United States, 15 of which were slave states. Eleven of these slave states, after conventions devoted to the topic, issued declarations of secession from the United States and created the Confederate States of America and were represented in the Confederate Congress. The slave states that stayed in the Union -- Maryland, Missouri, Delaware, and Kentucky (called border states) -- remained seated in the U.S. Congress. By the time the Emancipation Proclamation was issued in 1863, Tennessee was already under Union control. Accordingly, the Proclamation applied only to the ten remaining Confederate states. During the war, the abolition of slavery was required by President Abraham Lincoln for the readmission of Confederate states.

The U.S. Congress, after the departure of the powerful Southern contingent in 1861, was generally abolitionist: In a plan endorsed by Abraham Lincoln, slavery in the District of Columbia, which the Southern contingent had protected, was abolished in 1862. The Union-occupied territories of Louisiana and eastern Virginia, which had been exempted from the Emancipation Proclamation, also abolished slavery through respective state constitutions drafted in 1864. The State of Arkansas, which was not exempt but came partly under Union control by 1864, adopted an anti-slavery constitution in March of that year. The border states of Maryland (November 1864) and Missouri (January 1865), and the Union-occupied Confederate state, Tennessee (January 1865), all abolished slavery prior to the end of the Civil War, as did the new state of West Virginia (February 1865), which had separated from Virginia in 1863 over the issue of slavery. However, slavery persisted in Delaware, Kentucky, and (to a very limited extent) in New Jersey — and on the books in 7 of 11 of the former Confederate states.

Emancipation Proclamation 

The Emancipation Proclamation was a presidential proclamation and executive order issued by United States President Abraham Lincoln on January 1, 1863, during the Civil War. Lincoln preceded it with the Preliminary Emancipation Proclamation on September 22, 1862, which read:

That on the first day of January in the year of our Lord, one thousand eight hundred and sixty-three, all persons held as slaves within any State, or designated part of a State, the people whereof shall then be in rebellion against the United States shall be then, thenceforward, and forever free; and the executive government of the United States, including the military and naval authority thereof, will recognize and maintain the freedom of such persons, and will do no act or acts to repress such persons, or any of them, in any efforts they may make for their actual freedom.

On January 1, 1863, the Proclamation changed the legal status under federal law of more than 3.5 million enslaved African Americans in the secessionist Confederate states from enslaved to free. As soon as an enslaved person escaped the control of the Confederate government, either by running away across Union lines or through the advance of federal troops, the person was permanently free. Ultimately, the Union victory brought the proclamation into effect in all of the former Confederacy.

Thirteenth Amendment to the United States Constitution 

The Thirteenth Amendment (Amendment XIII) to the United States Constitution abolished slavery and involuntary servitude, except as punishment for a crime. Congress passed the amendment on January 31, 1865, was ratified by the required 27 of the then 36 states on December 6, 1865, and was proclaimed on December 18. It was the first of the three Reconstruction Amendments adopted following the American Civil War.
 
President Abraham Lincoln's Emancipation Proclamation, effective on January 1, 1863, declared that the enslaved in Confederate-controlled areas were free. When slaves escaped to Union lines or federal forces — including now-former slaves — that had advanced south, emancipation occurred without compensation to the former enslavers. On June 19, 1865 — Juneteenth — U.S. Army general Gordon Granger arrived in Galveston, Texas, to proclaim that the war had ended, and so had slavery (in the Confederate states). In the slave-owning areas controlled by Union forces on January 1, 1863, state action was used to abolish slavery. The exceptions were Kentucky and Delaware, where the Thirteenth Amendment finally ended slavery in December 1865.

Juneteenth 

Juneteenth is a federal holiday in the United States commemorating the emancipation of African-American slaves. It is also observed to celebrate African-American culture. Originating in Galveston, Texas, it has been celebrated annually on June 19 in various parts of the United States since 1865. The day was recognized as a federal holiday on June 17, 2021, when President Joe Biden signed the Juneteenth National Independence Day Act into law. Juneteenth's commemoration is on the anniversary date of the June 19, 1865, announcement of General Order No. 3 by Union Army general Gordon Granger, proclaiming freedom for slaves in Texas, which was the last state of the Confederacy with institutional slavery.

During the American Civil War (1861–1865), emancipation came at different times to different places in the Southern United States. Large celebrations of emancipation, often called Jubilees (recalling the biblical Jubilee in which enslaved people were freed) occurred on September 22, January 1, July 4, August 1, April 6, and November 1, among other dates. In Texas, emancipation came late: Enforced in Texas on June 19, 1865, as the Southern rebellion collapsed, emancipation became a well-known cause of celebration. While June 19, 1865, was not the actual end of slavery even in Texas (like the Emancipation Proclamation, itself, General Gordon's military order had to be acted upon), and although it has competed with other dates for emancipation's celebration, ordinary African Americans created, preserved, and spread a shared commemoration of slavery's wartime demise across the United States.

The end of slavery effectively occurred with the federal Padrone Act of 1874 (18 Stat. 251), which was enacted on June 23, 1874, "in response to exploitation of immigrant children in forced begging and street crime by criminalizing the practice of enslaving, buying, selling, or holding any person in involuntary servitude."

Slavery in the 21st century  

Since the abolition of slavery in the United States in 1865, efforts have been made to eliminate other forms of slavery. In 1890 the Brussels Conference Act adopted a collection of anti-slavery measures to end the slave trade on land and sea. In 1904 the International Agreement for the suppression of the White Slave Traffic was signed. In 1926 the Convention to Suppress the Slave Trade and Slavery was ratified.

Even after slavery became illegal more than a century ago, many criminal organizations continued to engage in human trafficking and slave trading. For this reason, human trafficking was made a federal crime. In 2000 the Victims of Trafficking and Violence Protection Act of 2000 was signed, and in 2014 the Human Trafficking Prevention Act was created. It amended the Trafficking Victims Protection Act of 2000 to require training for federal government personnel related to trafficking in persons. On 12 Dec 2000 the Protocol to Prevent, Suppress and Punish Trafficking in Persons, Especially Women and Children was adopted by the United Nations General Assembly, and the United Nations Office on Drugs and Crime was put in charge of implementing the protocol. In 2002 the Polaris Project was founded. Polaris is one of the few organizations working on all forms of trafficking, including both sex trafficking and labor trafficking. It furnishes support for survivors, whether male, female, transgender, or children, and whether U.S. citizens or foreign nationals.

Media 

 The documentary film, 13th, explores the "intersection of race, justice, and mass incarceration in the United States." Its title alludes to the Thirteenth Amendment to the United States Constitution, adopted in 1865, which abolished slavery and involuntary servitude in the United States, except as a punishment for a crime. Slavery, however, has been silently perpetuated by criminalizing behavior and enabling police to arrest poor freedmen and forcing them to work for the state. In addition, "carceral states" are managed by for-profit prison corporations.
 Traces of the Trade: A Story from the Deep North, is a 2008 documentary film that focuses on the descendants of the DeWolf family, a prominent slave-trading family who settled in Bristol, Rhode Island and trafficked Africans from 1769 to 1820, and on the legacy of the slave trade in the North of the United States.

See also 
 Slavery in the United States
 Timeline of abolition of slavery and serfdom
 History of civil rights in the United States
 Abolitionism
 Juneteenth
 History of unfree labor in the United States
 Slave Trade Act
 Slavery Abolition Act 1833
 Abolitionism in the United Kingdom
 Slavery Abolition Act 1833
 International Agreement for the suppression of the White Slave Traffic
 Supplementary Convention on the Abolition of Slavery
 Slavery in the 21st century

Notes

References

Slavery in the United States